Another Time...Another Place is the twelfth studio album by Christian singer Sandi Patti, released in 1990 on Word Records. Like her 1986 best seller and award winning album Morning Like This, Another Time...Another Place was another definitive album with in addition to her inspirational anthems, there are also some pop elements and uptempo songs. The title song features a duet with fellow Christian singer and songwriter Wayne Watson. It became a successful hit climbing to No. 1 on the Christian AC chart and would win them a GMA Dove Award for Pop/Contemporary Song of the Year and it also won Song of the Year, given to its writer Gary Driskell. The album also features popular CCM recording artist Amy Grant providing guest vocals on the song "Unexpected Friends". In 1991, Patti would win her fifth and final Grammy Award for Best Pop/Contemporary Gospel Album at the 33rd Grammy Awards and wins Female Vocalist of the Year and Inspirational Album of the Year at the 22nd GMA Dove Awards. Its music video won Short Form Music Video of the Year in 1992. The album peaked at No. 2 on the Billboard Top Christian Albums chart and was certified Gold in 1992 by the Recording Industry Association of America. The CD version contains a bonus track "Rejoice", originally recorded by Christian pop group NewSong.

Track listing

Personnel 
 Sandi Patti – vocals, rhythm track arrangements (3, 5, 8, 10, 11)
 Robbie Buchanan – keyboards, synth bass, rhythm track arrangements (4, 6, 10)
 Randy Kerber – keyboards, acoustic piano 
 Eric Persing – synthesizer programming 
 Dan Lee – guitars (1-4, 6-11)
 Marty Walsh – guitars (5)
 Paul Jackson Jr. – additional guitars (6)
 Nathan East – bass (1-9, 11)
 Gary Lunn – bass (10)
 Jeff Porcaro – drums (1-9, 11), percussion 
 John Robinson – drums (10)
 Charles Loper – brass (7, 8)
 Bill Reichenbach Jr. – brass (7, 8)
 Gary Grant – brass (7, 8)
 Jerry Hey – brass (7, 8), brass arrangements (7, 8)
 The Nashville String Machine – strings (1, 2, 4, 5, 6, 9, 10, 11)
 Carl Gorodetzky – string leader (1, 2, 4, 5, 6, 9, 10, 11)
 Alan Moore – string arrangements (1, 7)
 Greg Nelson – string conductor (1, 6, 7), rhythm track arrangements (4, 5, 6, 10, 11), string arrangements (6)
 Jeremy Lubbock – string arrangements and conductor (2, 4, 5)
 David T. Clydesdale – string arrangements and conductor (8, 9, 11), orchestra arrangements and conductor (10)
 John Higgins – rhythm track arrangements (8)
 Craig Patty – rhythm track arrangements (8)
 Michael Patty – rhythm track arrangements (8)
 Bob Farrell – rhythm track arrangements (9)
 Wayne Watson – vocals (2)
 Amy Grant – vocals (4)

Backing vocals
 Alan Moore – arrangements (1, 6)
 John Bahler – arrangements (7, 8)
 John Higgins – vocal concept (8)
 John Darnall – vocal contractor (10)
Singers
 Mike Eldred (1, 6, 10)
 Lisa Glasgow (1, 6)
 Mark Ivey (1, 6, 10)
 Marty McCall (1, 6)
 Sandi Patti (1, 5-10)
 Melodie Tunney (1, 6, 10)
 Kenny Day Jones – ad-lib vocal (3)
 John Bahler (7)
 Tom Bahler (7)
 Susan Boyd (7)
 Debbie Hall (7)
 Jon Joyce (7)
 Mary Bates George (10)
 Ellen Dockery (10)
 Ellen Musick (10)
 Gary Musick (10)
 Guy Penrod (10)
 Gary Robinson (10)
 Leah Taylor (10)
Choirs
 Christ Church Choir (3, 6)
 Landy Gardner – choir director (3, 6)
 The Kid Connection Choir (6)
 Janet McMahon-Wilson – kids choir director (6)

Production 
 John Helvering – executive producer 
 Greg Nelson – producer 
 Sandi Patti – producer 
 Jeff Balding – engineer 
 Jeff Abbey – additional engineer 
 Ken Allardyce – additional engineer 
 Mark Aspinall – additional engineer 
 Bob Clark – additional engineer 
 Tommy Cooper – additional engineer 
 James DeMain – additional engineer 
 Clark Germain – additional engineer
 Brian Jannsen – additional engineer, production coordinator
 John Kunz – additional engineer 
 Bob Loftus – additional engineer 
 Rail Rogut – additional engineer 
 Michael C. Ross – additional engineer 
 Eric Rudd – additional engineer 
 Hill Brim Swimmer – additional engineer 
 Frank Wolf – additional engineer 
 Doug Sax – mastering at The Mastering Lab (Hollywood, California)
 Cindy Wilt – production coordinator 
 Bob Muldoon – production assistance
 Brett Perry – production assistance
 Loren Balman – art direction, design, interior photography 
 Patrick Pollei – art direction, design 
 Pam Allen – design assistant 
 Janice Gibson – design assistant 
 Neill Whitlock – cover photography, interior photography 
 Mary Gross – album coordinator

Charts

Radio singles

Certifications and sales

Accolades
Grammy Awards

GMA Dove Awards
1991 Female Vocalist of the Year

References

1990 albums
Sandi Patty albums
Word Records albums